is a railway station in the city of Kamaishi, Iwate, Japan, operated by East Japan Railway Company (JR East).

Lines
Rikuchū-Ōhashi Station is served by the Kamaishi Line, and is located 73.7 kilometers from the starting point of the line at Hanamaki Station.

Station layout
The station has a single island platform. There is no longer a station building, but only a small shelter on the platform. The station is unattended.

Platforms

History
Rikuchū-Ōhashi Station opened on 11 October 1944. The station was absorbed into the JR East network upon the privatization of the Japanese National Railways (JNR) on 1 April 1987.

Surrounding area
 
 Rikuchū-Ōhashi Post Office
 Site of Kamaishi Copper Mine

See also
 List of railway stations in Japan

References

External links

  

Railway stations in Iwate Prefecture
Kamaishi Line
Railway stations in Japan opened in 1944
Kamaishi, Iwate
Stations of East Japan Railway Company